Students in Paris (Swedish: Studenter i Paris) is a 1932 American-Swedish operetta film directed by Louis Mercanton. It was made by Paramount Pictures at its Joinville Studios in Paris as the Swedish-language version of He Is Charming.

Cast
 Henri Garat 
 Steinar Jørandstad 
 Meg Lemonnier 
 Aino Taube

References

Bibliography 
 Waldman, Harry. Missing Reels: Lost Films of American and European Cinema. McFarland, 2000.

External links 
 

1932 films
1932 musical films
Swedish musical films
Operetta films
1930s Swedish-language films
Films directed by Louis Mercanton
Films shot at Joinville Studios
Swedish multilingual films
American multilingual films
American musical films
Swedish black-and-white films
American black-and-white films
1932 multilingual films
1930s American films
1930s Swedish films